Acianthera pubescens is a species of orchid.

pubescens